Netcong is a borough in Morris County, New Jersey, United States. As of the 2020 United States census, the borough's population was 3,375, an increase of 143 (+4.4%) from the 2010 census count of 3,232, which in turn had reflected an increase of 652 (+25.3%) from the 2,580 counted at the 2000 census. Netcong lies on the shores of Lake Musconetcong.

Established as South Stanhope by workers employed as miners in Stanhope, the name "Netcong" was adopted for the community in 1889 when a post office used the name. Netcong was incorporated as a borough by an act of the New Jersey Legislature on October 23, 1894, from portions of both Mount Olive Township and Roxbury Township, based on the results of a referendum held the previous day.

History

Netcong received its name from the Musconetcong River, named by the Lenape Native Americans and meaning "grass creek", "swamp stream", "rapid stream" or "clear stream place". Along with the river, the proximity of the old Morris and Sussex Turnpike, which passed through the region shortly after 1801, and the coming of the Morris Canal, in 1831, made the site a favorable one for development.

After becoming a borough, the residents had to elect the first governing body. The first Mayor was Abraham J. Drake, elected November 14, 1894. A census of Netcong taken July 1895 showed a population of 877 people.

Netcong derived much of its business from the Delaware, Lackawanna and Western Railroad, which had its last stop in Morris County in the heart of the Borough.  The DL&W's Sussex Branch to Branchville also stopped at Netcong Station, with the Sussex Branch coming into the opposite side of the station from where NJ Transit's line is today.  The big railroad roundhouse in Port Morris also supplied many jobs for the town residents.

In 1968, AT&T announced that the company would be building a two-story building in the borough at the bottom of a hole  underground. The facility, designed to connect a cable running between Boston and Miami, was designed to withstand a nuclear attack and continue 24-hour operations for as long as three weeks using supplies and generating capacity on the site.

Geography
According to the United States Census Bureau, the borough had a total area of 0.96 square miles (2.49 km2), including 0.83 square miles (2.16 km2) of land and 0.13 square miles (0.33 km2) of water (13.33%).

Netcong borders the municipalities of Mount Olive Township and Roxbury Township in Morris County; and Stanhope in Sussex County.

Demographics

2010 Census

The Census Bureau's 2006–2010 American Community Survey showed that (in 2010 inflation-adjusted dollars) median household income was $59,167 (with a margin of error of +/− $9,354) and the median family income was $72,222 (+/− $9,501). Males had a median income of $64,569 (+/− $6,401) versus $46,094 (+/− $3,857) for females. The per capita income for the borough was $32,135 (+/− $3,825). About 7.8% of families and 7.7% of the population were below the poverty line, including 7.3% of those under age 18 and 4.6% of those age 65 or over.

2000 Census
As of the 2000 United States census there were 2,580 people, 1,008 households, and 681 families residing in the town. The population density was 3,066.8 people per square mile (1,185.9/km2). There were 1,043 housing units at an average density of 1,239.8 per square mile (479.4/km2). The racial makeup of the borough was 94.30% White, 1.20% African American, 0.04% Native American, 1.67% Asian, 1.43% from other races, and 1.36% from two or more races. Hispanic or Latino of any race were 7.13% of the population.

The most common ancestries in Netcong is Italian (23.5%), Irish (11.4%), German (10.4%), English (6.6%), and Hungarian (3.3%)

There were 1,008 households, out of which 30.5% had children under the age of 18 living with them, 50.3% were married couples living together, 11.8% had a female householder with no husband present, and 32.4% were non-families. 26.3% of all households were made up of individuals, and 9.6% had someone living alone who was 65 years of age or older. The average household size was 2.56 and the average family size was 3.10.

In the borough the population was spread out, with 23.0% under the age of 18, 7.2% from 18 to 24, 32.7% from 25 to 44, 22.5% from 45 to 64, and 14.6% who were 65 years of age or older. The median age was 38 years. For every 100 females, there were 96.5 males. For every 100 females age 18 and over, there were 92.5 males.

The median income for a household in the borough was $55,000, and the median income for a family was $65,833. Males had a median income of $42,179 versus $36,458 for females. The per capita income for the borough was $23,472. About 2.5% of families and 3.1% of the population were below the poverty line, including 1.2% of those under age 18 and 5.4% of those age 65 or over.

Government

Local government
Netcong is governed under the Borough form of New Jersey municipal government, which is used in 218 municipalities (of the 564) statewide, making it the most common form of government in New Jersey. The governing body is comprised of the Mayor and the Borough Council, with all positions elected at-large on a partisan basis as part of the November general election. The Mayor is elected directly by the voters to a four-year term of office. The Borough Council is comprised of six members elected to serve three-year terms on a staggered basis, with two seats coming up for election each year in a three-year cycle. The Borough form of government used by Netcong is a "weak mayor / strong council" government in which council members act as the legislative body with the mayor presiding at meetings and voting only in the event of a tie. The mayor can veto ordinances subject to an override by a two-thirds majority vote of the council. The mayor makes committee and liaison assignments for council members, and most appointments are made by the mayor with the advice and consent of the council.

, the Mayor of Netcong is Republican Joseph A. Nametko, whose term of office ends December 31, 2023. Members of the Borough Council are Council President Joseph W. Albensi III (R, 2024), Robert E. Hathaway Jr. (D, 2022), Thomas A. Laureys (R, 2022), Todd Morton (R, 2024), Elmer M. Still (R, 2023) and John "Jack" Sylvester Jr. (R, 2023).

Federal, state and county representation
Netcong is located in the 7th Congressional District and is part of New Jersey's 25th state legislative district. Prior to the 2011 reapportionment following the 2010 Census, Netcong had been in the 24th state legislative district.

 

Morris County is governed by a Board of County Commissioners comprised of seven members who are elected at-large in partisan elections to three-year terms on a staggered basis, with either one or three seats up for election each year as part of the November general election. Actual day-to-day operation of departments is supervised by County Administrator, John Bonanni. , Morris County's Commissioners are
Commissioner Director Tayfun Selen (R, Chatham Township, term as commissioner ends December 31, 2023; term as director ends 2022),
Commissioner Deputy Director John Krickus (R, Washington Township, term as commissioner ends 2024; term as deputy director ends 2022),
Douglas Cabana (R, Boonton Township, 2022), 
Kathryn A. DeFillippo (R, Roxbury, 2022),
Thomas J. Mastrangelo (R, Montville, 2022),
Stephen H. Shaw (R, Mountain Lakes, 2024) and
Deborah Smith (R, Denville, 2024).
The county's constitutional officers are the County Clerk and County Surrogate (both elected for five-year terms of office) and the County Sheriff (elected for a three-year term). , they are 
County Clerk Ann F. Grossi (R, Parsippany–Troy Hills, 2023),
Sheriff James M. Gannon (R, Boonton Township, 2022) and
Surrogate Heather Darling (R, Roxbury, 2024).

Politics
As of March 23, 2011, there were a total of 1,754 registered voters in Netcong, of which 385 (21.9%) were registered as Democrats, 654 (37.3%) were registered as Republicans and 715 (40.8%) were registered as Unaffiliated. There were no voters registered to other parties.

In the 2012 presidential election, Republican Mitt Romney received 55.1% of the vote (649 cast), ahead of Democrat Barack Obama with 43.6% (514 votes), and other candidates with 1.3% (15 votes), among the 1,185 ballots cast by the borough's 1,870 registered voters (7 ballots were spoiled), for a turnout of 63.4%. In the 2008 presidential election, Republican John McCain received 56.3% of the vote (751 cast), ahead of Democrat Barack Obama with 42.1% (561 votes) and other candidates with 1.0% (13 votes), among the 1,334 ballots cast by the borough's 1,822 registered voters, for a turnout of 73.2%. In the 2004 presidential election, Republican George W. Bush received 62.3% of the vote (778 ballots cast), outpolling Democrat John Kerry with 36.5% (456 votes) and other candidates with 0.6% (10 votes), among the 1,249 ballots cast by the borough's 1,784 registered voters, for a turnout percentage of 70.0.

In the 2013 gubernatorial election, Republican Chris Christie received 73.6% of the vote (550 cast), ahead of Democrat Barbara Buono with 23.4% (175 votes), and other candidates with 2.9% (22 votes), among the 770 ballots cast by the borough's 1,834 registered voters (23 ballots were spoiled), for a turnout of 42.0%. In the 2009 gubernatorial election, Republican Chris Christie received 59.0% of the vote (543 ballots cast), ahead of  Democrat Jon Corzine with 30.3% (279 votes), Independent Chris Daggett with 8.9% (82 votes) and other candidates with 0.9% (8 votes), among the 921 ballots cast by the borough's 1,787 registered voters, yielding a 51.5% turnout.

Education
Netcong is home to the Netcong School District, which serves public school students in pre-kindergarten through eighth grade at Netcong Elementary School. As of the 2018–19 school year, the district, comprised of one school, had an enrollment of 289 students and 26.0 classroom teachers (on an FTE basis), for a student–teacher ratio of 11.1:1.

For ninth through twelfth grades, public school students attend Lenape Valley Regional High School, which serves students from Netcong and from the Sussex County communities of Byram Township and Stanhope. As of the 2018–19 school year, the high school had an enrollment of 691 students and 58.0 classroom teachers (on an FTE basis), for a student–teacher ratio of 11.9:1. Seats on the high school district's nine-member board of education are allocated based on the populations of the constituent municipalities, with two seats assigned to Netcong. Netcong residents previously attended Netcong High School. The school closed in 1974 and the building became Netcong Elementary School.

St. Michael School is a Catholic school operated under the auspices of the Roman Catholic Diocese of Paterson, that was founded in 1923, and staffed by the Sisters of Christian Charity of Mendham starting in 1945.  The school merged with four other elementary schools, moved to the campus at Pope John XXIII Regional High School in Sparta, NJ, and closed at the end of the school year in June 2016.

Patron saint

The patron saint of the borough is St. Cesario deacon and martyr of Terracina. In 1893 some Italian immigrants left their hometown of Cesa, a province of Caserta (Italy), to come to the United States. They settled in Netcong, attracted by job opportunities at the Singer Steel Foundry, and in the construction of the railroad which was replacing the Morris Canal as a means of transportation. They established the "St. Cesario Society" in 1902 in honor of their hometown's patron saint, Cesario deacon and martyr. Saint Cesario is venerated in St. Michael Church of Netcong; a bone fragment with the Latin cartouche "ex ossibus S. Caesarii diac. m." is preserved in this church, set in a silver reliquary, solemnly exposed on the high altar for the feast, celebrated on the penultimate Saturday of July. In Saint Michael's Church also includes a wooden statue of St. Cesario, a stained glass window and an icon (in the Sacristy) depicting the martyr.

On June 6, 2019, the mayor of Netcong, Joe Nametko, signed the Pact of Sister Cities with Cesa, in honor of St. Cesario.

Transportation

Roads and highways

Several major highways pass through Netcong, leading to the borough's motto of "All Roads Lead to Netcong". Major roadways in Netcong include Interstate 80 (the Bergen-Passaic Expressway), U.S. Route 46 and Route 183, the latter two highways meeting at the Netcong Circle. The New Jersey Department of Transportation (NJDOT) uses Netcong as a control city on directional signage on its highways throughout northern New Jersey, and as far away as the George Washington Bridge, even though less than one-tenth of a mile of Interstate 80 is in the borough (from mile markers 26.33 to 26.42). Interstate 80 and U.S. Route 206 intersect with U.S. Route 46 in the southwest corner of the borough at Exit 26.

In 2007, the New Jersey Department of Transportation proposed the elimination of the Netcong Traffic Circle, located at the intersections of U.S. Route 46 and Route 183 just north of the interchange with Interstate 80, and its replacement with a signalized intersection. The circle itself dated back to construction in 1938 and was unable to handle the 17,000 vehicles a year that used the large roadway daily. The circle was the frequent site of vehicular  accidents, including a total of 81 in 2007 and 2008. The project had issues dealing with the vertical clearance of the overpass for U.S. Route 46 westbound. The removal of the circle would eliminate this bridge, and the land would go to use as the new signalized intersection, with pedestrian and bicycle fittings. The entire project cost about $13.3 million of state and local funds to construct. A temporary interchange was implemented in January 2013, with the permanent intersection configuration completed that August.

Public transportation

NJ Transit operates weekday rail service at the Netcong station to Hoboken Terminal, with service to Penn Station in New York City via Midtown Direct on the Montclair-Boonton Line and the Morristown Line.

NJ Transit used to provide local service on the MCM5 route. The Morris County Department of Transportation provides bus service along Route 46 to Dover and Mount Olive Township.

Lakeland Bus Lines provides service along Route 80 between Newton and the Port Authority Bus Terminal in Midtown Manhattan.

In view of Netcong's rich railroad history, the borough has been named as a site for the New Jersey State Railroad and Transportation Museum (jointly with Phillipsburg). Given that the site envisioned for this museum in Phillipsburg has been sold for development as a townhouse complex and college campus annex, it is unclear what role Phillipsburg will play in this museum. Funding will need to be secured in order to build and operate this museum.

Notable people

People who were born in, residents of, or otherwise closely associated with Netcong include:

 John Giannantonio (born ), former football player whose 594.5 rushing yards per game average, 4,756 season rushing yards total, and single-game rushing 754 yards against Mountain Lakes High School, all set in 1950 as a sophomore at Netcong High School, remain national high school records as of 2016
 Hugh Meade (1907–1949), congressman who represented Maryland's 2nd congressional district from 1947 to 1949
 Reince Priebus (born 1972), chairman of the Republican National Committee

References

External links

 Borough of Netcong website
 Netcong School District
 
 School Data for the Netcong School District, National Center for Education Statistics
 Lenape Valley Regional High School
 Daily Record regional area newspaper
 Netcong High School Mixed Chorus,  (photo)
 Netcong History and Historical Photos

 
1894 establishments in New Jersey
Borough form of New Jersey government
Boroughs in Morris County, New Jersey
Populated places established in 1894